"Dough" is the fourth episode of the third series of British television sitcom, Bottom. It was first broadcast on 27 January 1995.

Synopsis
Eddie and Richie's money forging enterprise causes them to run afoul of local hard man, "Skullcrusher" Henderson. Can they find 5 grand by closing time, or will they have their skulls crushed?

Plot
Richie is alone in his room having just finished reading Leo Tolstoy's novel War and Peace, when he hears loud noises coming from Eddie's room next door. Richie attempts to get into Eddie's room, but is met with a sharp stick to the eye and having his genitals set on fire. After falling downstairs and extinguishing his groin, Richie gets excited when Spudgun and Dave Hedgehog show up. They are too socially awkward to reject Richie's attempts at conversation with them, and only when Eddie comes downstairs do they head to Eddie's room. Richie follows and discovers what Eddie's been up to: he has been forging money. Eddie gives Spudgun and Hedgehog thousands of pounds in forged money, before Richie notices that the notes bear absolutely no resemblance to real money; rather, they feature pornographic images of the British royal family and other celebrities with misprinted currency numbers. Eddie reveals that his plan is to make sure people are so shocked by the perverse images that they will never notice how unconvincing the forgeries are.

The four head down to the local pub to try out their plan on landlord Dick Head. The plan initially seems to work, but when Dick retreats to the backroom to "take a closer look," he phones his friend "Skullcrusher" Henderson, the biggest forger in London. Once the others have downed their expensive drinks, Dick politely informs them that Skullcrusher takes a psychotically, violently dim view of competing forgers, and unless they pay him £5,000 by the end of the night, he will come down there and crush their skulls. The group, suddenly realising why he is called the Skullcrusher, initially panics, before they discover that the pub has its annual quiz that evening, with a £5,000 prize. They settle the £200 entry fee with gold teeth, which they violently extract from each other's mouths.

The four later return to the pub for the quiz, and Eddie attempts to buy drinks with a forged 137-krugerrand note. In an effort to cheat in the quiz, Richie hides an edition of the Encyclopædia Britannica in the toilet. Eddie takes a rather more proactive approach and sabotages the other team's buzzers to administer near-lethal electric shocks when pressed. Eventually their team is the only one left, but they are still too stupid to answer any of the questions. Richie retreats to the toilet while Eddie stalls Dick by asking him about the time he had a tryout with Queens Park Rangers. Richie tries to consult the encyclopedia, only to find that a patron has used the necessary volume as toilet paper. Richie attempts to attack the patron, but he himself is beaten up instead. After passing on yet another question, Dick simply gives up and awards them the prize.

Skullcrusher shows up at that moment, and Richie and Eddie hand over their winnings; but, it turns out that the prize money was forged by Skullcrusher himself (and which are not much more convincing than Eddie's forgeries, featuring Danny La Rue instead of the Queen), and the boys get their skulls crushed anyway.

Cast

This episode marks the final appearances for all three of the show's recurring minor characters: Spudgun, Hedgehog and Dick.

1995 British television episodes
Bottom (TV series)
Works about money forgery